Why We Sing is a studio album by American singer Dionne Warwick. It was released by Rhino Records on  January 28, 2008. Warwick's first gospel album in nearly 40 years, it was produced in part by her son Damon Elliott, also featuring involvement from BeBe Winans, Percy Bady, and the New Hope Baptist Church Choir.

Critical reception

Allmusic editor John Bush found that on Why We Sing "Warwick's voice may be weaker than in the '60s and '70s, but the productions and guest features are solid. Ironically, even in this gospel medium, where a strong voice is arguably more important than anything else, Warwick succeeds, perhaps by the force of her convictions and the importance of the project in her mind." He noted that the productions don't suffer from "adult contemporary slickness [...] most are recorded with a small group occasionally leavened with strings, and given a light touch by producers Percy Bady and Damon Elliott. Altogether, the results are quite good; it's a highly personal project that permits outsiders to enjoy it, and while it's quite smooth, it's never slick enough to enjoy that adult contemporary or coffeehouse crossover."

Track listing

Charts

Release history

References 

Dionne Warwick albums
2008 albums